Sabelo Nhlapo (born 17 December 1988 in Johannesburg) is a retired South African rugby union player, who most recently played with the . His regular position is prop.

Career

Youth
Nhlapo represented Johannesburg-based side  at the Under-18 Academy Week tournament in 2006, which led to his inclusion in the CAR Under-18 tournament that year.

He then joined the  Academy, where he played at Under-19 level in 2007 and at Under-21 level in 2008 and 2009. Once again, he received representative honours during this time, playing for the South African Under-19 side at the 2007 Under 19 Rugby World Championship and for their U20 side at the 2008 IRB Junior World Championship.

Sharks
He made twenty appearances for them in the Vodacom Cup competition over the next three seasons, but failed to break into their Currie Cup side, despite being named in their squad which won the 2010 Currie Cup Premier Division title and also being included in the  Super Rugby squad for the 2011 Super 15 season.

Varsity Cup
In 2012, he returned to Gauteng to join Pretoria-based Varsity Cup side  and made fourteen appearances for them during the 2012 and 2013 seasons. UP Tuks won the competition in both occasions, with Nhlapo playing in both finals.

Boland Cavaliers
He made seven appearances for them during that competition.

Pumas
He was a member of the Pumas side that won the Vodacom Cup for the first time in 2015, beating  24–7 in the final. Nhlapo made four appearances during the season.

References

South African rugby union players
Living people
1988 births
Rugby union players from Johannesburg
Boland Cavaliers players
Sharks (Currie Cup) players
Pumas (Currie Cup) players
South Africa Under-20 international rugby union players
Rugby union props